Schneider v. Rusk, 377 U.S. 163 (1964), was a United States Supreme Court case which invalidated a law that treated naturalized and native-born citizens differentially under the due process clause of the Fifth Amendment.

Background
Angelika Schneider, a German immigrant, came to the US with her parents and became a United States citizen upon their naturalization at age 16. When she graduated from college, she moved back to Germany.

The State Department claimed Schneider had lost her US citizenship in accordance with a section of the Immigration and Nationality Act which revoked the citizenship of any naturalized citizen who returned to his or her country of birth and remained there for at least three years.

Opinion
The Supreme Court held that since no provision of the law stripped natural-born Americans of their citizenship as a result of extended or permanent residence abroad, it was unconstitutionally discriminatory to apply such a rule only to naturalized citizens.

References

Sources
Schneider v. Rusk: Great American Court Cases
The Supreme Court: Welcome Home TIME, May 29, 1964

External links

1964 in United States case law
United States Supreme Court cases
United States Supreme Court cases of the Warren Court
United States immigration and naturalization case law